Black Angel is a 1980 British short film that was shown before the theatrical release of The Empire Strikes Back in certain locales. It was the directorial debut of Star Wars art director Roger Christian.  The film negative was thought to be lost until it was rediscovered in December 2011. In June 2015, it was announced that Christian was working on a feature film adaptation of Black Angel which would be partly funded through crowd-funding site Indiegogo.

Premise
Sir Maddox, a medieval knight, returns from the Crusades to find his home rife with sickness and his family gone.  As he journeys through this mystical realm he encounters a mysterious and beautiful maiden, who appears to him as he is drowning.  Sir Maddox learns that the maiden is being held prisoner by a black knight and in order to free her he must confront her captor, the Black Angel.

Cast
Patricia Christian – Maiden
James Gibb – Anselm
Tony Vogel – Sir Maddox
John Young – Old Man

Production
The film was shot at Eilean Donan in Scotland in autumn 1979. The budget of £25,000 was given to Roger Christian by an Eady Scheme fund from the British government.

Release and rediscovery
George Lucas tied the film as a programme with The Empire Strikes Back in the United Kingdom, Australia and Scandinavia. It was never released on any home media, such as VHS and DVD, and for many years the original negatives were believed to be lost.

In December 2011, the 35 mm negative was rediscovered by an archivist at Universal Studios in Los Angeles, California. On 13 October 2013, it was screened for the first time since its original release, and became available on Netflix and the iTunes Store for streaming and download, respectively, in early 2014.

On 12 May 2015, the film was uploaded to YouTube with an introduction by Christian.

Feature film adaptation
In June 2015 it was announced that Roger Christian was working on a feature film adaptation of the short and an Indiegogo campaign was started to raise money for the film.

References

External links
 
 
 
 

1980 films
1980 short films
British epic films
Films directed by Roger Christian
Films shot in Scotland
Rediscovered British films
Films scored by Trevor Jones
1980 fantasy films
1980s rediscovered films
British fantasy films
1980s English-language films
1980s British films